Kosten may refer to:

Places
Kościan, in Poland
Kosten, Bulgaria, a village in Sungurlare municipality, Burgas Province
Kosteno, Greece

People 
Annabel Kosten (born 1977), Dutch Olympic female swimmer
Anthony Kosten (born 1958), English-French chess Grandmaster
Kosten (born 1997), American street photographer, and professional urban explorer

Other
Kosten (surname), a Dutch surname
Kosten unit, a Dutch measure for aircraft noise